PESA Tramicus 122N is a tram produced by the Polish company PESA in Bydgoszcz. It has a modern fully low-floor design. Currently the trams of this type are used in Łódź and Bydgoszcz. The vehicles also come with accumulators, which allow, in case of a power failure, to drive 50 more metres.

Production

External links
  Technical data from the producer (Łódź)
  Technical data from the producer (Bydgoszcz)

Tram vehicles of Poland
PESA trams